is a Japanese music group founded in 1989. It consists of Takkyu Ishino and Pierre Taki.

History
Denki Groove was founded in 1989 by Takkyu Ishino and Pierre Taki, both of whom are natives of Shizuoka, Shizuoka Prefecture.

The group's major-label debut studio album, Flash Papa, was released in 1991, the first being 662 BPM by DG in 1990. They also released a few albums, including U.F.O. (1991), Karateka (1992), Vitamin (1993), Dragon (1994), Orange (1996), A (1997), and Voxxx (2000). Their single, "Shangri-La", had sold more than half a million copies. They went on hiatus between 2001 and 2004.

In 2019, Pierre Taki was arrested on suspicion of cocaine possession. In response, Sony Music Entertainment Japan took Denki Groove's recordings off the shelves and stopped streaming the group's music. Streaming services were resumed on June 19, 2020.

Members
Current members
 Takkyū Ishino – vocals, production 
 Pierre Taki – vocals, production 

Former members
 Mimio – guitar 
 Koji Takahashi – production 
 Jun Kitagawa (CMJK) – production, turntables 
 Yoshinori Sunahara – production

Discography

Studio albums
 662 BPM by DG (1990)
 Flash Papa (1991)
 U.F.O. (1991)
 Karateka (1992)
 Vitamin (1993)
 Dragon (1994)
 Orange (1996)
 A (1997)
 Voxxx (2000)
 Denki Groove toka Scha Dara Parr (2005) 
 J-Pop (2008)
 Yellow (2008)
 20 (2009)
 Human Beings and Animals (2013)
 Tropical Love (2017)
 30 (2019)

Compilation albums
 Flash Papa Menthol (1993)
 Drill King Anthology (1994)
 Recycled A (1998)
 The Last Supper (2001)
 Singles and Strikes (2004)
 Denki Groove Golden Hits: Due to Contract (2011)
 Denki Groove Decade 2008-2017 (2017)
 Tropical Love Lights (2017)

Live albums
 Ilbon 2000 (2000)

EPs
 Dragon EP (1995)
 Orange Remixes (1996)
 Hirake! Pon-chak (1996) 
 Drill King Golden Hits Vol. 1 (2001)
 Drill King Golden Hits Vol. 2 (2001)
 Drill King Golden Hits Vol. 3 (2001)
 Dessert (2001)
 25 (2014)

Singles
 "Rhythm Red Beat Black (Version 300000000000)" (1991) 
 "Mud Ebis" / "Cosmic Surfin'" (1991)
 "Snake Finger" (1992)
 "Transistor Radio" (1993) 
 "N.O." (1994)
 "Popo" (1994)
 "Kame Life" (1994)
 "Zinsei (Hardfloor Remix)" (1994)
 "Niji" (1995)
 "Dareda!" (1996)
 "Asunaro Sunshine" (1997)
 "Shangri-La" (1997)
 "Pocket Cowboy" (1997)
 "Flashback Disco" (1999)
 "Nothing's Gonna Change" (1999)
 "Twilight" (2005) 
 "Saint Ojisan" (2005) 
 "Shonen Young" (2007)
 "Mononoke Dance" (2008)
 "The Words" (2009)
 "Upside Down" (2009)
 "Shameful" (2012)
 "Missing Beatz" (2013)
 "Fallin' Down" (2015)
 "Man Human" (2018)
 "Set you Free" (2020)
 "Homebase" (2022)

References

External links

 Official website
 

Japanese electronic music groups
Japanese techno music groups
Japanese pop music groups
Musical groups from Shizuoka Prefecture
Ki/oon Music artists